Andreas Sofokleous (born September 7, 1973) is a Cypriot former international football defender.

He played for two rivals of Limassol, Apollon and AEL, AEK Larnaca and APEP Pitsilia.

Honours
AEK Larnaca
 Cypriot Cup: 2003–04

References

References
 

1973 births
Living people
Cypriot footballers
Cyprus international footballers
Greek Cypriot people
Association football midfielders
Apollon Limassol FC players
AEL Limassol players
AEK Larnaca FC players